Deborah Czeresko (born July 27, 1961) is an American glass blower known for winning the first season of the Netflix series, Blown Away.

Education

In 1983, Czeresko graduated from Rutgers University and graduated from Tulane University in 1992.

Career

Her works are in the permanent collection of the Museum of American Glass in Millville, New Jersey, Glasmuseet Ebeltoft, and the Frauenau Glass Museum. She served on the board of directors for UrbanGlass, a glassblowing studio based in Brooklyn, from 2008 to 2018. 

In 2019, she won the first season of the Netflix series, Blown Away. 

In 2019, her piece, "Meat Chandelier," was one of 100 chosen for The Corning Museum of Glass' exhibition, New Glass Now, a survey of contemporary glass from around the world. Her prize package from winning "Blown Away" included a residency at The Corning Museum of Glass.

Artistry 
Using Venetian-style glassmaking techniques, Czeresko's work showcases her personal experiences shaped by contemporary issues. Czeresko often uses her work as a glassmaker to highlight the issue of women's equality. She said in an interview, "So, I’ve long been interested in women occupying these spaces that involve physicality, where they’re perceived as not belonging. I wanted to make glass the great equalizer."

Selected exhibitions 
2006: Transparency, Corridor Gallery, Reykjavik, Iceland
2007: Art Now, Middlebury College Museum of Art, Middlebury, VT
2010: Armory Show, UrbanGlass, Armory Arts Week, Brooklyn, NY
2010: Shoefitti & Ibeam, Louisville Glassworks, Louisville, KY
2010: The Fabritory, Glasphemy by Macro Sea, Brooklyn, NY
2011: Shoefitti, Hudson Beach Glass, Philadelphia, PA
2013: Art of the Fellowship, Museum of American Glass, Millville, NJ
2015: CreativityAscertained, Museum of American Glass, Millville, NJ
2015: Post Mortem, UGent, Rommelaere Instituut, Ghent, Belgium
2018: How Shall We Dine, Rockland Center for the Arts, Rockland, NY
2018: StreetKraft, Habatat Gallery, Royal Oak, MI
2019: New Glass Now, The Corning Museum of Glass, Corning, NY
2019: COLLABORATIONS with QUEER VOICES curated by Matthew Day Perez + Kate Hush, Heller Gallery, New York, NY

References

External links
 
 

1961 births
Living people
Women glass artists
21st-century American women artists
Rutgers University alumni
Tulane University alumni
Participants in Canadian reality television series
American women television personalities
Glassblowers
21st-century American artists
American glass artists